Ximenkou Station, literally West Gate Station, is a station on Line 1 of the Guangzhou Metro that started operations on 28June 1999. It is situated under Zhongshan 6th Road in the Yuexiu District of Guangzhou City, Guangdong Province, southern China.

Station layout

Exits

Around the station
 Guangxiao Temple
 Huaisheng Mosque
 Temple of the Six Banyan Trees

References

Railway stations in China opened in 1999
Guangzhou Metro stations in Yuexiu District